Youngsville is the name of some places in the United States of America:

Youngsville, Louisiana
Youngsville, New Mexico, on State Rt. 96, northwest of Española
Youngsville, North Carolina
Youngsville, Ohio, an unincorporated community
Youngsville, Pennsylvania